Claudius Gilbert (1670–1742) was an Irish academic.

He was born in Belfast and educated at Trinity College Dublin. He became a Fellow of Trinity College in 1693 and Regius Professor of Divinity in 1722. He was also Rector of Ardstraw.

References

18th-century Irish Anglican priests
Alumni of Trinity College Dublin
Academics of Trinity College Dublin
1670 births
1742 deaths
Regius Professors of Divinity (University of Dublin)
Clergy from Belfast